Bruyères is a commune in the Vosges department in Grand Est in northeastern France.

The town built up around a castle built on a hill in the locality in the 6th century.  It was the birthplace of Jean Lurçat, in 1892.

History
In World War II, Bruyères was liberated from German occupation by Japanese-American soldiers of the 442nd Regimental Combat Team. The Battle of Bruyères and the rescue of the "Lost Texas Battalion" is now considered to be one of the ten major military battles fought by the United States Armed Forces. The 100th/442nd Regiment became the most decorated Unit in the History of the US Army (8 Presidential Unit Citation, 21 Medal of Honor and 18,143 individual decorations). On July 8 & 9, 1989, the bicentennial of the presentation of the "Bill of Human Rights" by Mounier, Pierre Moulin created and inaugurated the "Peace and Freedom Trail." Encompassing 89 points of interest, the "Peace and Freedom Trail" highlights the actions of the 442nd RCT and their campaign to free Bruyères from German occupation during World War II.
 Arboretum du col du Haut-Jacques

Notable residents
Gaston About

Twin towns
 Vielsalm
 Honolulu

See also
Communes of the Vosges department

References

External links

Town website 
 Le Chemin de la Paix et de la Liberte de Bruyeres

Communes of Vosges (department)
Duchy of Lorraine